Ignatius Peter VIII Abdalahad (born Peter Gregory Abdalahad; 30 June 1930 – 4 April 2018) was patriarch of Antioch and all the East of the Syriac Catholic Church. He served as patriarch from 2001 to 2008, when he resigned and retired.

Biography
He was ordained priest on October 17, 1954 and consecrated bishop on June 21, 1997 by Syriac Catholic Patriarch Ignatius Antony II Hayyek, and served as auxiliary bishop of Antioch till his appointment as Primate and Patriarch of the Syriac Catholic Church on February 16, 2001. His resignation was accepted on February 2, 2008. He lived in Beirut. He was succeeded by Ignatius Joseph III Yonan, who was elected as Primate and Patriarch on January 20, 2009 and his election confirmed by Pope Benedict XVI on January 22, 2009.

Ignatius Peter VIII Abdalahad died in Jerusalem on 4 April 2018.

Distinctions 
Grand Master of the Order of Saint Ignatius of Antioch

References

	

	

	

1930 births
2018 deaths
Syriac Catholic Patriarchs of Antioch
People from Aleppo
20th-century Eastern Catholic archbishops
21st-century Eastern Catholic archbishops
Recipients of the Order of Saint Ignatius of Antioch
20th-century Syrian people
21st-century Syrian people